Carrega may refer to
Carrega Ligure, a comune (municipality) in Alessandria, Italy
Michel Carrega (born 1934), French trap shooter
Baga (grape), also known as Carrega Burros